Saltugilia australis (syn. Gilia australis) is a species of flowering plant in the phlox family known by the common name southern gilia.

It is endemic to southern California, where it grows in sandy habitat in the Transverse Ranges, Peninsular Ranges, and Mojave Desert mountains.

Description

The glandular inflorescence produces tiny flowers with green sepals sometimes dotted with purple and ribbed with membranous tissue between the ribs.

References

External links

Jepson Manual Treatment: Saltugilia australis

Polemoniaceae
Endemic flora of California
Natural history of the California chaparral and woodlands
Flora of the California desert regions
Natural history of the Mojave Desert
Natural history of the Peninsular Ranges
Natural history of the Santa Monica Mountains
Natural history of the Transverse Ranges
Flora without expected TNC conservation status